Spiderr is the eighth studio album by Swedish musician Bladee. It was released on 30 September 2022 via Year0001. The album was announced via Bladee's Instagram on 15 September 2022 and along with the announcement, a song and accompanying video directed by Ecco2k "Drain Story" was shared. Spiderr follows Bladee's and Ecco2K's 2022 collaborative album Crest.

Track listing 

Notes
 All but "Disaster Prelude", "Velociraptor" and "She's Always Dancing" are stylised in full uppercase.
 "Disaster Prelude" is almost entirely stylised in uppercase, but with a letter in lowercase. ("DiSASTER PRELUDE")

References

External links
 

2022 albums
Bladee albums
Year0001 albums